Asghar Ali Khan is a Bangladesh Nationalist Party politician and the former Member of Parliament for Gaibandha-2.

Career
Khan retired as a Major from Bangladesh Army. He was elected to parliament from Gaibandha-2 as a candidate in 1988. He contested the 1996 election from Gaibandha-3 as a Bangladesh Nationalist Party candidate.

References

Bangladesh Nationalist Party politicians
Living people
4th Jatiya Sangsad members
Bangladesh Army officers
Year of birth missing (living people)